The CBP Border Patrol Academy is a training academy for future agents of the United States Border Patrol. It is located in Artesia, New Mexico.

Located at the Federal Law Enforcement Training Center FLETC Artesia formerly site of the College of Artesia. It consist of a 3,620-acre site with a full range of training facilities, dormitories, classrooms, and one emergency driver training range. Is a six-month training program includes driving, concealed carry, immigration law, and Spanish language.

See also 

 Federal Law Enforcement Training Centers

References

Education in Eddy County, New Mexico
United States Border Patrol
Federal police academies in the United States